Auburn hair is a human hair color, a variety of red hair, most commonly described as reddish-brown in color. Auburn hair ranges in shades from medium to dark. It can be found with a wide array of skin tones and eye colors. The chemical pigments that cause the coloration of auburn hair are frequently pheomelanin with high levels of eumelanin; however, the auburn hair is due to a mutated melanocortin 1 receptor gene in Northwestern European people and by a mutated TYRP1 gene in the Melanesians and Austronesians, both genes that reduce the melanin production of the hair cells.

Differentiation

"Auburn" can be used to describe many shades of reddish hair with similar definitions or hues. It is often conflated in popular usage with Titian hair. Whereas Titian hair is a brownish shade of red hair, auburn hair is specifically defined as including the actual color red. Most definitions of Titian hair describe it as a brownish-orange color, but some describe it as being reddish. This is in reference to red hair itself, not the color red.

Auburn encompasses the color maroon, but so too do chestnut and burgundy. In contrast with the two, auburn is more red in color, whereas chestnut is more brown, and burgundy is more purple; chestnut hair is also often referred to as "chestnut-brown".

Etymology
The word "auburn" comes from the Old French word alborne, which meant blond, coming from Latin word alburnus ("off-white"). The first recorded use of auburn in English was in 1430. The word was sometimes corrupted into abram, for example in early (pre-1685) folios of Coriolanus, Thomas Kyd's Soliman and Perseda (1588) and Thomas Middleton's Blurt, Master Constable (1601).

Geographic distribution
Auburn hair is common among people of northern and western European descent, as well as North Africans, but it is rare elsewhere. Auburn hair occurs most frequently in Scandinavia (Denmark, Norway and Sweden), Britain, Ireland, continental Germanic Europe (Germany, Austria, the Netherlands, Belgium, and Luxembourg), France and northern Iberia, Poland, and Russia. This hair color is less common farther south and southeast, but can occur somewhat regularly in Southern Europe (more so in Spain, and to some extent Portugal and Italy).  It can also be found in other parts of the world colonized by genetically European people, such as North America, South America, Australia, New Zealand, South Africa, Siberia, etc.

Auburn is sometimes seen among the indigenous people of Taiwan (Formosa), but it is absent in the later Han Chinese immigrants.  With them it is not due to the mutated MC1R gene but to the mutated TYRP1 gene, both of which reduce melanin production.

See also
 Blond hair
 Titian hair
 Red hair

References

External links 
 Online Etymology Dictionary

Hair color
Red hair
Brown hair
Shades of brown